Brijbushan Rajpoot aka Guddu Bhaiya is an Indian politician and a member of 17th Legislative Assembly of Charkhari, Uttar Pradesh of India. He represents the Charkhari constituency of Uttar Pradesh and is a member of the Bharatiya Janata Party.

Political career
Brijbhushan Rajpoot is a son of Shri Ganga Charan Rajput ( Ex M.P. Loksabha & Rajya Sabha) has been a member of the 17th Legislative Assembly of Uttar Pradesh. Since 2017, he has represented the Charkhari constituency and is a member of the BJP.

On 29 November 2018, Rajpoot made a 5-year-old disabled boy MLA for a day.

Posts held

See also
Uttar Pradesh Legislative Assembly
Ganga charan rajput https://en.m.wikipedia.org/wiki/Ganga_Charan_Rajput

References

Uttar Pradesh MLAs 2017–2022
Bharatiya Janata Party politicians from Uttar Pradesh
Living people
Year of birth missing (living people)